Alan John George Morley MBE (born 25 June 1950 in Bristol, England) is a former English rugby union player.

He played a record number of 519 times for Bristol, scoring 384 tries, between 1968 and 1986.

He won 7 England caps, from 1972 to 1975, scoring 2 tries, 8 points on aggregate. He played at the 1975 Five Nations Championship, scoring a try. He was selected for the 1974 Lions tour but didn't make the Test side, having to compete with J.J. Williams, Billy Steele and Andy Irvine. The highlight of his international career was probably scoring a try on his international début on 3 June 1972, against  when an unfancied England side won 18-9.

References

External links
Lions profile
scrum.com profile
Rugby Heroes

1950 births
Living people
Bristol Bears players
British & Irish Lions rugby union players from England
England international rugby union players
English rugby union players
Gloucestershire County RFU players
Members of the Order of the British Empire
People educated at Colston's School
Rugby union players from Bristol
Rugby union wings